KL Special Force is a 2018 Malaysian Malay-language action film directed by Syafiq Yusof. The film stars Rosyam Nor, Syamsul Yusof, and Fattah Amin. It was released on 8 March 2018 and co-produced by Skop Productions, Damofa Productions and Viper Studios.

Plot
A Royal Malaysian Police special task force led by Roslan sought to bring down a group of mafias known as the Gang Anarchist led by Asyraff in Kuala Lumpur. A young policeman named Zul was absorbed in a police task force to help Roslan solve the case, but the situation became more complicated as Asyraff began manipulating feelings, minds and sympathy between Roslan and Zul. A secret would be revealed when Anarkis robbed a Dato Meor's bank, Damofa Bank. What's the secret? How do the police want to beat the Gang?

Roslan was called by Asyraff that he is arrived in his house that he is kill Diana that inside it. He runs to his house and calls Diana, but instead Diana calls him, she goes to her room and prays for the God. As Asyraff prepares to kill Diana, he sees her that she is praying. Asyraff leaves this house instead of killing her. Meanwhile, Zul handcuffs Raj and escapes from the police station to save Mia. Zul tries to call Mia, but was ran over by lorry that Asyraff drove it. Asyraff kills several police officers and captures Zul.

At the warehouse, Zul is tied up by Asyraff, along with his fiancée, Mia and Dato Mior. Asyraff explains to Zul that his mother got raped by Dato Mior. 
Asyraff and Rizal hire an assassin who try to get revenge on Dato Mior. At the court, his mother retracts the lawsuit. As an assassin prepares to kill Dato Mior but was shot dead by Roslan. Asyraff spokes that his changes the world. Zul accepts join Asyraff's side, but he kills Dato Mior instead of spares him. The police surrounds around the warehouse areas that Asyraff has inside on it. Zul and Mia manage to escape, but Asyraff stops them as shot Mia's leg. An engaging fight between Zul and Asyraff until he points to Mia with the gun. Roslan and his squad members, along with Asyraff's mother are watching and she tells Asyraff to stop. Asyraff counts to three to bring him the helicopter. But the helicopter won't come, Asyraff refuses to be a loses, executes Mia, but Asyraff was shot dead by squad members.

Zul was sented to the mental hospital. Roslan apologies to Zul that he doubted him. Roslan tell a story to Zul about that 'This world will not be destroyed by those who do evil, but this world will be ruined by those who watch evil doings and do nothing.

Cast
 Rosyam Nor as Roslan, a leader of KL Special Force
 Fattah Amin as Zul, a rookie of KL Special Force
 Syamsul Yusof as Asyraff, a leader of Gang Anarkis
 Mustaqim Bahadon as Rizal, Ashraf's brother
 Josiah Hogan as Burn, member gang Anarkis
 Ramona Zamzam as Nadia, gang Anarkis member
 Mahmud Ali Bashah as Dato' Meor, Owner of Damofa Bank
 Shaharuddin Thamby as Superintendent Azmi
 Esma Danial as Inspector Zamri
 Puteri Balqis as Amira, daughter of Roslan and Diana 
 Sabrina Ali as Diana, Roslan's wife 
 Tania Hudson as Mia, Dato' Meor's daughter and Zul's fiancée 
 Liza Abdullah as Asyraf and Rizal's Mother
 Roslan Saleh as Assassin
 Razib Salimin as Azman, undercover cop (also stuntman in this film)
 Siraj Al Shagoff as Raj 
 Ruzzlan Abdullah Shah as Kevin 
 Dato’ Wira Mohd Fadino Khairuman as Dino
 Izzy Reef as Ashraff teenager
 Jali Masari as Rizal teenager
 Mior Farez as Security guard disguised

Production
KL Special Force was announced in May 2016. It is directed by Syafiq Yusof and marks his seventh film to date after SAM (2012), Abang Long Fadil (2014), Villa Nabila (2015), Mat Moto (2016), Desolasi (2016) and Abang Long Fadil 2 (2017). The film also marks Skop Productions’ 39th movie to date and Fattah Amin’s film debut. Filming took place in July and August 2016 in Kuala Lumpur, Tambun, Perak and Putrajaya.

Reception
KL Special Force was released on 8 March 2018 and it was a commercial success. As of 4 April 2018, the film grossed more than RM12.1 million.

During the show some people started boycotted campaign against this movie that because one of the director DAMOFA Production was accused to involve in crime Ponzi scheme .

Soundtrack 
The theme song of the movie is "Selamat Tinggal Masa" (Goodbye Times) sung by Black Hanifah ft Syamsul Yusof and this song write and compose by Syamsul with cousin Dr Anwar Fazal.

References

External links
 

2018 films
2018 action films
Films about bank robbery
Malay-language films
Malaysian action films
Films set in Kuala Lumpur
Police detective films
Skop Productions films
Films produced by Yusof Haslam
Films directed by Syafiq Yusof